Design Your Own Railroad is a 1990 video game published by Abracadata.

Gameplay
Design Your Own Railroad is a game in which a railroad hobbyist can build a model railroad and run simulations.

Reception
Russell Sipe reviewed the game for Computer Gaming World, and stated that "In summary, if you are a model railroader/rail fan you will find this product a very enjoyable extension of your chosen hobby (but be sure to get version 1.2 or later). Non-railroaders (even if they enjoyed Railroad Tycoon) will either find themselves drawn into the world of model railroading by DYORR, or find themselves bored stiff. As for me, I love it."

Reviews
InCider
PCGames

References

1990 video games
Amiga games
Classic Mac OS games
DOS games
Railroad business simulation video games
Train simulation video games
Video games developed in the United States